Luigi Conti may refer to:

Luigi Conti (athlete), (born 1937), Italian long-distance runner
Luigi Conti (nuncio), (1929–2015), Italian Roman Catholic prelate, Apostolic Nuncio in different countries
Luigi Conti (archbishop), (born 1941), Italian Roman Catholic prelate, Archbishop of Fermo (since 2006)